Gemini TV is an Indian Telugu language general entertainment pay television channel. It was launched on 9 February 1995 by Gemini Group, owned by A. Manohar Prasad (grandson of L. V. Prasad), in association with Sun TV Network. In 1996-97, Sun TV Network acquired a controlling interest in the channel. Gemini TV is the first satellite TV channel in Telugu. The channel's programming consists of Telugu-language serials, films, film-based programs and game shows alongside some reality shows. The channel's HD feed, Gemini TV HD was launched on 11 December 2011.

History
Gemini TV was launched on 9 February 1995. It is founded by Gemini Group of Hyderabad (run by A. Manohar Prasad, grandson of L. V. Prasad), in association with Sun TV Network. In 1996-97, Sun TV Network acquired a controlling interest in the channel. Gemini TV is the first satellite TV channel in Telugu. Gemini TV began with only a four-hour service via a Rimsat satellite uplinked from Singapore. Later it expanded its broadcast time to 12 hours a day. By May 2000, Gemini was considered as a strong number two to the leader ETV.

The Sun Group started working in the television business through three companies of which Gemini Television Private Limited broadcast Telugu language channels, while Sun Television Private Limited and Uday Television Private Limited broadcast Tamil and Kannada language channels respectively. In November 2006, Kalanithi Maran merged Gemini TV Ltd with Sun TV Network Ltd along with Udaya TV Ltd for the IPO listing of Sun TV Network.

Sun18

Network18 Group has 50% dealing distribution with Sun TV Network, which led them to make Sun18. In July 2010, with the creation of Sun18, Sun TV Network became responsible for the South Indian market, while Network18 was responsible for the North Indian market.

Within a few years, Sun TV Network began distributing its channels as its own companies, while Viacom18 distributed its tracks through a single company named IndiaCast Media Distribution Private Limited.

Market 
By May 2000, Gemini was considered as a strong number two to the leader ETV. From early 2000s, Gemini remained the market leader until 2016. But in 2017-18, Gemini TV slipped to third or fourth positions, due to heavy competition from ETV, Zee Telugu and especially Star Maa. This situation further worsened during the years 2019, 2020 and 2021 and Gemini TV lost most of its market share. But sometimes it did regain its majority share, but it was not constant.

Sun TV Network, its parent company tried to regain its lost viewership by introducing some new reality shows. But it was only a partial success. As of September 2022, it still has not regained its lost viewership, with its situation worsening.

Sister Channels in Telugu 

 Gemini Movies
 Gemini Comedy
 Gemini Life
 Gemini Music
 Kushi TV
 Gemini News (defunct)

Programming

See also
 List of Telugu-language television channels

Notes

References

External links
 GEMINI TV Official Site 

Telugu-language television channels
Television channels and stations established in 1995
1995 establishments in Andhra Pradesh
Sun Group
Television stations in Hyderabad